The Roman Catholic Diocese of Jamshedpur is a diocese located in the city of Jamshedpur in the Ecclesiastical province of Ranchi in India.

History
 2 July 1962: Established as Diocese of Jamshedpur from the Archdiocese of Calcutta

Leadership
 Bishops of Jamshedpur (Latin Rite)
 Bishop Telesphore Bilung, S.V.D. (1 November 2021 – present)
 Bishop Felix Toppo, S.J. (14 June 1997 – 24 June 2018)
 Bishop Joseph Robert Rodericks, S.J. (25 June 1970 – 9 January 1996)
 Archbishop Lawrence Trevor Picachy, S.J. (later Cardinal) (Apostolic Administrator 29 May 1969 – 25 June 1970)
 Bishop Lawrence Trevor Picachy, S.J. (later Cardinal) (12 July 1962 – 29 May 1969)

References

External links
 GCatholic.org 
 Catholic Hierarchy 
 Diocese website

Roman Catholic dioceses in India
Christian organizations established in 1962
Roman Catholic dioceses and prelatures established in the 20th century
1962 establishments in Bihar
Christianity in Jharkhand
Jamshedpur